Rajesh Joseph Latchoo (born 8 June 1984) is a Trinidadian football coach, currently managing Dominica.

Managerial career
In June 2011, Latchoo was appointed head coach of Joe Public at the age of 27.

Latchoo managed the Trinidad and Tobago women's national football team at various youth levels.

In March 2017, following a 21 game spell at TT Pro League club Morvant Caledonia United, Latchoo was appointed manager of Dominica.

Managerial Statistics

References

1984 births
Living people
Trinidad and Tobago football managers
Dominica national football team managers
Joe Public F.C. managers